Jason Andersen (born September 3, 1977, as Jason Young) is a former American football center who played for four seasons with the New England Patriots National Football League (NFL). He played college football at BYU. He has also played for the Kansas City Chiefs.

Early years
Andersen attended Piedmont Hills High School in San Jose, California. In High School he lettered in football, basketball, and track. In football he was a two-time all-league and all-county selection as an offensive and defensive tackle and long snapper. In basketball he was a two-time all-league center. Andersen was recruited to play for BYU.

College career
After graduating from high school, Andersen attended BYU, where he played multiple positions on the offensive line. In his sophomore and junior season, he played mainly right guard, with some games as right tackle. In his senior season, he played as center.

Professional career
Andersen played for New England Patriots and Kansas City Chiefs, while being signed with the Miami Dolphins and Cleveland Browns. He also played 3 seasons in the Arena football League, playing for the Arizona Rattlers, San Jose Sabercats, and Utah Blaze.

References

1977 births
Living people
Sportspeople from Hayward, California
Players of American football from California
Sportspeople from Los Angeles County, California
American football centers
American football offensive guards
BYU Cougars football players
New England Patriots players
Kansas City Chiefs players